Herta Ratzenhofer (27 June 1921 – 6 January 2010) was an Austrian pair skater. Competing with her brother Emil Ratzenhofer, she won five gold medals at the Austrian Figure Skating Championships. The pair won the bronze medal at the European Figure Skating Championships in 1948 and 1949, and they finished ninth at the 1948 Winter Olympics.

Ratzenhofer died in Austria on 6 January 2010, at the age of 88.

Results
Pairs with Ratzenhofer

References

Navigation

1921 births
2010 deaths
Austrian female pair skaters
European Figure Skating Championships medalists
Figure skaters at the 1948 Winter Olympics
Olympic figure skaters of Austria